Calliostoma thachi is a species of sea snail, a marine gastropod mollusc in the family Calliostomatidae.

Some authors place this taxon in the subgenus Calliostoma (Benthastelena).

Description
The height of the shell attains 21 mm.

Distribution
This marine species occurs off Vietnam.

References

External links
 

thachi
Gastropods described in 2007